Joseph S. Van Bokkelen (born June 7, 1943) is a senior United States district judge of the United States District Court for the Northern District of Indiana.

Education and career

Born in Chicago, Illinois, Van Bokkelen received a Bachelor of Arts degree from Indiana University in 1966 and a Juris Doctor from Indiana University Maurer School of Law in 1969. He was a Deputy attorney general of Office of the Indiana Attorney General from 1969 to 1970. He was an Assistant attorney general of Office of the Indiana Attorney General from 1971 to 1972. He was an Assistant United States Attorney of the United States Attorney's Office for the Northern District of Indiana from 1972 to 1975. He was in private practice in Indiana from 1975 to 2001. He was the United States Attorney for the Northern District of Indiana from 2001 to 2007.

Federal judicial service

On January 9, 2007, Van Bokkelen was nominated by President George W. Bush to a seat  on the United States District Court for the Northern District of Indiana vacated by Rodolfo Lozano. Van Bokkelen was confirmed by the United States Senate on June 28, 2007, and received his commission on July 18, 2007. He assumed senior status on September 29, 2017.

Sources

1943 births
Living people
American people of Dutch descent
Assistant United States Attorneys
Indiana University alumni
Indiana University faculty
Judges of the United States District Court for the Northern District of Indiana
People from Chicago
United States Attorneys for the Northern District of Indiana
United States district court judges appointed by George W. Bush
21st-century American judges
Indiana University Maurer School of Law alumni